Rion Brown (born September 3, 1991) is an American professional basketball player for the Nanterre 92 of the French Pro A. He is a 6'6" (1.98 m) tall shooting guard-small forward.

High school
Brown attended Liberty County High School, in Hinesville, Georgia, where he played high school basketball. In high school, he was a teammate of Jordan McRae.

College career
Brown played college basketball at the University of Miami, with the Miami Hurricanes, from 2010 to 2014. As a senior, he averaged 15.5 points, 5.8 rebounds, and 2.3 assists per game.

Professional career
Brown began his pro career in 2014, with the Israeli Super League club Hapoel Tel Aviv. Later that same year, he joined the Belgian League club Excelsior Brussels. In 2016, he moved to the Finnish League club Kataja Basket. He joined the French Pro A League club JDA Dijon Basket, in 2017. He moved to the Greek Basket League club Promitheas Patras, in 2018.

On July 19, 2019, Brown signed a two-year (1+1) contract with EuroLeague club and Greek Basket League champions Panathinaikos.

On January 10, 2020, Brown moved to Turkey and signed with EuroCup club Tofaş.

On August 7, he signed for the Slovenian team Cedevita Olimpija.

On August 17, 2021, Brown signed with BC Enisey of the VTB United League. He averaged 11.4 points, 4.9 rebounds, 2.0 assists and 1.3 steals per game.

On March 25, 2022, Brown was acquired via waivers by the Agua Caliente Clippers.

On June 24, 2022, he has signed with Nanterre 92 of the French Pro A.

Personal life
Brown's father, Tico, was also a professional basketball player.

References

External links
FIBA Champions League Profile
Greek Basket League profile 
Greek Basket League profile 
Miami Hurricanes bio
College stats @ sports-reference.com

1991 births
Living people
ABA League players
Agua Caliente Clippers players
American expatriate basketball people in Belgium
American expatriate basketball people in Finland
American expatriate basketball people in France
American expatriate basketball people in Greece
American expatriate basketball people in Israel
American expatriate basketball people in Russia
American expatriate basketball people in Slovenia
American men's basketball players
Basketball players from Georgia (U.S. state)
Brussels Basketball players
Hapoel Tel Aviv B.C. players
JDA Dijon Basket players
Kataja BC players
KK Cedevita Olimpija players
Miami Hurricanes men's basketball players
Nanterre 92 players
Panathinaikos B.C. players
Promitheas Patras B.C. players
Shooting guards
Small forwards
Tofaş S.K. players